"If We've Ever Needed You" is a song written and performed by contemporary Christian band Casting Crowns from their 2009 album Until the Whole World Hears. It peaked at No. 5 on  Billboard's Hot Christian Songs chart, and it also held the No. 1 spot the on Soft AC/Inspirational chart for 8 weeks.

Charts

Weekly charts

Year-end charts

References

Casting Crowns songs
2010 singles
Songs written by Mark Hall (musician)
2009 songs